Danny Phantom is an American animated superhero action adventure television series created by Butch Hartman for Nickelodeon. The series follows Danny Fenton, a teenage boy who, after an accident with an unpredictable portal between the human world and the "Ghost Zone", becomes a human-ghost hybrid and takes on the task of saving his town (and the world) from subsequent ghost attacks using an evolving variety of supernatural powers. Danny is aided in his quest by his two best friends Sam Manson and Tucker Foley, and later, his older sister Jazz, who for most of the series' run are among the only people who know of his double life.

Throughout its run, Danny Phantom  received five Annie Award nominations and positive reviews. In the recent years, it has received renewed attention and critical acclaim from critics and audiences, being considered by many as Hartman's best and most acclaimed work. Additionally, Danny Phantom has spawned video games, home video releases, toys, and various other merchandise. A campaign to revive Danny Phantom called the Go Ghost Again Movement has spawned in recent years, including a petition on Change.org that has received thousands of signatures.

The show aired on April 3, 2004, right after 2004 Kids' Choice Awards.

Premise
Daniel "Danny" Fenton, a 14-year-old boy living in the small town of Amity Park, lives with his ghost hunting eccentric parents, Jack and Madeline "Maddie", and his overprotective but caring sixteen-year-old sister, Jasmine "Jazz". Upon pressure from his two best friends, Samantha "Sam" Manson and Tucker Foley, Danny decides to explore the Ghost Portal created by his parents in their attempt to bridge the human world and the Ghost Zone (the parallel universe in which ghosts reside), that when plugged in, failed to work. Once inside, he inadvertently presses the "On" button (which his parents naively failed to do), thus activating the Portal and infusing his DNA with ectoplasm, transforming him into a half-ghost.

Danny, who calls himself "Danny Phantom" in ghost form, develops the ability to fly, to become invisible, to become intangible, and to "overshadow" (possess and control) people after first learning how to switch back and forth at will between his ghost and human forms. Over time, he develops much stronger abilities, such as his Ghost Ray (a concentrated blast of energy he fires from his hand), his Ghostly Wail (an intensely powerful scream with sonic capabilities that knocks back anything caught in its path), and even cryokinesis. Danny is initially frightened by his new abilities and has little control over them, but he soon learns to use them to protect his town from evil spirits. Danny turns to the life of a superhero, using his powers to rid his hometown of the various ghosts and mutant animals which begin to plague it and are almost always brought into the world thanks to the sporadic activation of the Fentons' Ghost Portal. Sam, Tucker, and Jazz are Danny's primary allies in his ghost-fighting activities, and help him keep his ghost-half a secret.

Danny's ghost form is a polarization of what he looked like when he first entered the Ghost Portal. When he "goes ghost", his jet-black hair turns snow-white, his sky blue eyes turn neon green, and the black-and-white jumpsuit he had put on before the accident appears in negative color, with the originally white areas of the suit appearing black, and vice versa. In the premiere episode of season two, a ghost grants Sam's inadvertent wish that she and Danny had never met; in consequence, Danny loses not only memories but his ghost powers as well, as Sam had primarily been the one to persuade Danny to investigate the Portal in the first place, which led to the accident. Luckily, however, Sam had been protected from the wish by the ghost-hunting tech of Danny's parents, allowing her to persuade the now fully human Danny to regain his powers by re-enacting the accident. This time, before Danny enters the Portal, Sam replaces the logo of his father's face on the jumpsuit, which she also had removed the first time (if she hadn't, it would have been part of Danny's ghost form), with her recently designed a "DP" fused-letter logo on the chest so that it appears when he goes ghost from then on.

Danny faces threats of many kinds, including vengeful ghost hunter Valerie Gray (voiced by Cree Summer) who, for a short period of time, becomes his love interest, an enemy half-ghost Vlad Masters, an old college friend of his father's and considered to be Danny's true arch-rival, and even his own parents who, as ghost hunters, view Danny Phantom (as they would and do to any ghosts) as nothing but a menace to human society. Furthermore, Danny tries to keep his secret safe from his classmates, teachers, and family. Throughout the progression of the series, Danny slowly realizes his own potential and purpose, while both worlds slowly begin to accept him as their defender.

Cast and characters
Characters were designed by Stephen Silver and Ben Balistreri.
Daniel "Danny" Fenton / Danny Phantom (voiced by David Kaufman) is the series' titular protagonist. Danny is a fourteen-year-old boy who gains ghost powers in a lab accident when he steps into and activates his parents' Ghost Portal. Now a human-ghost hybrid, he chooses to use his superpowers to fight against malevolent ghosts who regularly escape the mysterious Ghost Zone and plague his hometown of Amity Park. A rather unpopular student in high school along with his friends, Danny also faces the typical hardships of living a normal teenager's life. With the additional challenges of protecting Amity Park from frequent ghost attacks, learning to control his ghost powers, and maintaining his secret identity as "Danny Phantom", especially at his house, where he is constantly stressfully mentally and/or physically hunted down by both his increasingly suspicious older sister–who desperately wants to know what is causing her brother so much anxiety–and his eccentric ghost-hunting parents–who believe their son is constantly being possessed by Danny Phantom. A prevalent story arc centers on his struggle to use his powers for the benefit of others rather than abuse them for his own needs, though he ultimately makes the right decision with the help of his friends. Despite frequently struggling with self-confidence, Danny values his selflessness, relentless courage and his altruism, and comes to appreciate his own self-worth.
Samantha "Sam" Manson (voiced by Grey DeLisle) is Danny's female best friend and eventual girlfriend at the end of the series; she is also responsible for the accident in which Danny gains his powers. Sam is a fourteen-year-old girl who is a self-proclaimed goth and a practitioner of a dramatized form of vegetarianism called "Ultra Recyclo-Vegetarianism" (often generalized as "not eating anything that had a face") and is an amateur activist, often protesting about environmental issues and animal rights. At first, she is Danny's closest friend; however, her romantic feelings for Danny strengthen over time. Her patience pays off, as Danny secretly falls in love with her as well; they ultimately share their true feelings with each other and become a couple.
Tucker Foley (voiced by Rickey D'Shon Collins) is Danny's African-American male best friend, a nerd who is obsessed with technology and carries a PDA at all times. When not obsessing over gadgets, he obsesses over girls. Like Sam, he shares in Danny's secret and often helps battle ghosts and send them back into the Ghost Zone. He generally provides comic relief–along with Danny's puns and witty quips. Tucker's gadgets are sometimes redundant but work well in the Ghost Zone or against ghosts. Tucker and Sam frequently handle the toils and triumphs of aiding Danny, especially when he's "going ghost."
Jasmine "Jazz" Fenton (voiced by Colleen O'Shaughnessey) is Danny's somewhat overprotective but incredibly loving and well-intentioned older sister. An intelligent and highly sociable overachiever whose accomplishments unknowingly make Danny feel insignificant, under-appreciated, and stupid in comparison–making her little brother feel like he has something to prove. Jazz–while only two years older than Danny–acts as a surrogate parent to her little brother, as their real parents don't pay much attention to their kids, something both Jazz and Danny have learned to live with. Taking care of her brother all her life has initially caused Jazz to think more like an adult then a teenager, unaware that Danny needs a big sister more than he needs the parent she tries so hard to be now that he's old enough to look after himself. Jazz views her parents' obsession with ghosts and the paranormal world as a sign of needing psychological help. She eventually learns about Danny's ghost powers, but chooses not to reveal her knowledge until he is ready to talk about them with her, not realizing that he continuously searches for a way to tell her. Once Danny realizes that Jazz knows about his double life, as per the episode The Ultimate Enemy, they become much closer. Jazz eventually develops a deep respect for her brother's selflessly heroic nature and supports him through "thick and thin".
Jack Fenton (voiced by Rob Paulsen) is Danny and Jazz's father and Maddie's husband. Jack expresses an obsession with destroying ghosts, blindly holding the belief that all ghosts are evil and must be destroyed, including Danny Phantom. He is generally incompetent in nature, but can be an effective fighter when provoked. Jack cares about his family but doesn't know about Danny's powers. He is almost never seen without his orange jumpsuit.
Madeline "Maddie" Fenton (voiced by Kath Soucie) is Danny and Jazz's mother and Jack's wife. She is a gifted genius and dedicated hunter of ghost, though she usually aims to dissect and study them rather than destroy them. A ninth-degree black belt, she is an excellent, competent fighter from whom Danny probably inherited his own talent for combat. Like her husband, she doesn't know about Danny's powers and is almost never seen without her blue jumpsuit.
Vlad Masters / Vlad Plasmius (voiced by Martin Mull) is Danny's nemesis throughout the series. Vlad had attended college at the University of Wisconsin–Madison with Jack and Maddie until Jack's prototype Ghost Portal shot ghost energy into Vlad's face, giving Vlad ecto-acne and ghost powers and ruining his social life. Half-ghost for 20 years, Vlad has much more experience with his ghost powers than Danny. Vlad serves as the main antagonist throughout the entire series as he always tries to steal Maddie away from Jack and to persuade Danny to join his side and destroy his friends. However, Vlad does ally with Danny from time to time during situations where it is needed.

Episodes

Production

According to a video on Butch Hartman’s YouTube channel, Butch came up with the idea while helping his mom move to California. Among the ideas Butch had for the show was a Scooby-Doo version, Danny with an owl sidekick named “Spooky” and Danny riding a ghost motorcycle. But those ideas were scrapped. He then started to draw Danny in different sizes and styles like for example, Danny being shorter, Danny being taller and Danny being muscular but all the drawings Butch completed had Danny with dark hair. So one day, Butch was drawing Danny in his ghost outfit. He left the shoes and the gloves white but when he got to Danny's hair, Butch was like "That's really cool". Butch found out that when Danny turns into a ghost, his hair is white so he left the hair that way. Then he was at a restaurant with the head of Nickelodeon. He tells Butch that The Fairly OddParents was going so well and asks him "What else do you have?". Butch then says "Well, I got this show called "Danny Phantom". It's about a kid with ghost powers". And the Nickelodeon head tells Butch "Can you have it done by March?".

Broadcast
Danny Phantom premiered on April 3, 2004, at 9:30 p.m. with its first episode airing after the 2004 Kids' Choice Awards, two days after Nickelodeon's 25th anniversary. The series aired its final episode on August 24, 2007. The series aired on CBC, YTV, and Nickelodeon in Canada. Danny Phantom also appeared on CITV in the UK as part of the CITV morning block Action Stations in 2008.

Merchandise

Video games
There have been two video games released for the main series. Danny Phantom: The Ultimate Enemy (for the Game Boy Advance) was made to promote the then upcoming special "The Ultimate Enemy" with the main gameplay consisting of events from the TV movie. It is a 2D platformer and was released September 8, 2005. Danny Phantom: Urban Jungle for both the Game Boy Advance and Nintendo DS was to promote the Danny Phantom episode "Urban Jungle". It is loosely based on the episode and is strictly a shooter game. It was released September 19, 2006.

Danny is one of the main heroes in the Nicktoons Unite! series, appearing in all four games across multiple platforms, Nicktoons Unite!, Nicktoons: Battle for Volcano Island, Nicktoons: Attack of the Toybots, and SpongeBob SquarePants featuring Nicktoons: Globs of Doom.

Danny Phantom and other characters and locations from the series have also been featured in other Nickelodeon crossover video games including: Nicktoons: Summer Camp, Nicktoons Basketball (PC), Nicktoons: Freeze Frame Frenzy (Game Boy Advance), Nicktoons Movin' (PlayStation 2), Nicktoons Winners Cup Racing (PC), Nicktoons Nitro (Arcade), Nicktoons MLB, Nickelodeon Super Brawl Universe (Android, iOS), Nickelodeon Kart Racers 2: Grand Prix (PlayStation 4, Xbox One, Nintendo Switch, Microsoft Windows), Nickelodeon All-Star Brawl (PlayStation 4, PlayStation 5, Xbox One, Xbox Series X/S, Nintendo Switch, and Microsoft Windows), Nickelodeon Extreme Tennis (Apple Arcade), and Nickelodeon Kart Racers 3: Slime Speedway (PlayStation 4, PlayStation 5, Xbox One, Xbox Series X/S, Nintendo Switch, and Microsoft Windows).

Danny is featured in the trailer for the Smite and Nickelodeon crossover, along with Rocko from Rocko's Modern Life and Zim from Invader Zim, released on July 5, 2022. The Nickelodeon exclusive edition was released a week later.

Print media
In October 2005, Scholastic Corporation published a Nick Zone chapter book, Stage Fright, with an original Danny Phantom story written by Erica David and illustrated by Victoria Miller and Harry Moore. Danny Phantom also made several appearances in Nickelodeon Magazine, including original comics "Brat's Entertainment!" (featuring Youngblood) and "Seeing Red" (featuring Undergrowth).

A graphic novel, titled Danny Phantom: A Glitch In Time is in the works, set for release in July 2023. It will be written and illustrated by Gabriela Epstein and published by Abrams Books. The graphic novel will be set after the events of the series finale and feature the return of Dark Danny.

Home media

Nick Picks releases

CreateSpace releases

Shout! Factory releases

Other releases

Toys 
Little official merchandise has been produced for Danny Phantom.

In 2005, Burger King released a line of Danny Phantom kids' meal toys.

In 2012, a company called Jazwares Toys released a 6-inch tall action figure of Danny Phantom as part of their Nicktoons toy line.

In 2020, Funko Pop released a limited edition Danny Phantom figure for 2020 New York City Comic Con. The figure was also released in Target stores.

Apparel 
As of 2020, a line of Danny Phantom shirts is available at Kohl's as part of their licensed Nickelodeon merchandise collection.

Reception

Critical reception
Danny Phantom was well received by both television critics and audiences, gathering a cult following since its original run. Sean Aitchison from CBR said “Danny Phantom might have a few elements that firmly place it in the 2000s, but the storytelling and design still feel fresh and fun in modern day. The show was full of action and humor, and the characters felt real and layered. If you're looking for an old Nickelodeon cartoon to rewatch, Danny Phantom should be on your list.” Eric McInnis writing for Study Breaks Magazine said, “The show offered fun comedy, memorable characters, and fantastic character designs for the enemies Danny had to fight in each episode.” Joly Herman of Common Sense Media criticized the mature themes of Danny Phantom, saying that, “This cartoon can be funny, and the characters are unique. But, as is the case with so many contemporary cartoons, the rush to violence overshadows the good aspects of the series. Death threats, torture, knives, and violence against women are commonplace. There's no opportunity to work things out. Danny is either a coward or a hero -- there's no in between. He either fights or perishes, which is a heavy choice for a sensitive guy.”

Awards and nominations

Controversies
On June 8, 2017, YouTuber Randy Stair killed three people at his workplace before taking his own life. He was fascinated by Ember McLain, a character from the Danny Phantom series, to the point of creating his own cartoon series based on Ember. Obsessed with the character, Stair had written earlier in his online journal that she wanted him to kill.

References

External links

 
 
 

 
2004 American television series debuts
2007 American television series endings
2000s American animated television series
2000s American comic science fiction television series
2000s American high school television series
2000s Nickelodeon original programming
American children's animated action television series
American children's animated adventure television series
American children's animated comic science fiction television series
American children's animated science fantasy television series
American children's animated superhero television series
Animated television series about families
Animated television series about ghosts
English-language television shows
Nicktoons
Teen animated television series
Teen superhero television series
Television series by Rough Draft Studios
Television series created by Butch Hartman
Television shows adapted into video games
Television shows set in Colorado